Roman Pylypchuk (born 27 April 1967) is a Ukrainian professional football manager and former player. He is currently the manager of Slovenian PrvaLiga club Celje.

Career
As a player, Pylypchuk made his debut in the Soviet Top League in 1990 for FC Dynamo Moscow.

References

External links
 

1967 births
Living people
People from Snizhne
Sportspeople from Donetsk Oblast
Soviet footballers
Association football forwards
Ukrainian footballers
Ukrainian expatriate footballers
Expatriate footballers in Israel
FC Tekstilshchik Ivanovo players
FC Dynamo Moscow players
FC Spartak Vladikavkaz players
Maccabi Herzliya F.C. players
Maccabi Netanya F.C. players
Maccabi Petah Tikva F.C. players
FC Metalurh Donetsk players
FC Metalurh-2 Donetsk players
FC Shakhtar Snizhne players
Soviet Top League players
Liga Leumit players
Ukrainian Premier League players
Ukrainian Second League players
Ukrainian Amateur Football Championship players
Ukrainian football managers
Ukrainian expatriate football managers
Expatriate football managers in Russia
Expatriate football managers in Moldova
Expatriate football managers in Latvia
Expatriate football managers in Tajikistan
Expatriate football managers in Belarus
Expatriate football managers in Slovenia
Ukrainian expatriate sportspeople in Israel
Ukrainian expatriate sportspeople in Russia
Ukrainian expatriate sportspeople in Moldova
Ukrainian expatriate sportspeople in Latvia
Ukrainian expatriate sportspeople in Tajikistan
Ukrainian expatriate sportspeople in Belarus
Ukrainian expatriate sportspeople in Slovenia
FC Dacia Chișinău managers
FC Olimpik Donetsk managers
FC Dinamo Minsk managers
Moldovan Super Liga managers
NK Celje managers